Estancia Moat is a large farm in southern Isla Grande de Tierra del Fuego facing Beagle Channel. It is the southernmost cattle farm in the World. Estancia moat is connected by road to Estancia Harberton and Ushuaia.

Referecnes

Ranches in Argentina
Populated places in Tierra del Fuego Province, Argentina